Josepa Not, better known as Pepita Not, (1900 – 4 June 1938) was a Spanish anarcho-syndicalist militant.

Biography 
She was born to a peasant family, and when she was a girl she lost her mother. At the age of 11, due to the imposition of her father, she began to work as a maid and cook for the family of a French widow in Barcelona.

With her friend Ramona Berni she joined the Confederación Nacional del Trabajo (CNT), of which she was an active propagandist. In 1918, she met the prominent anarchist militant Ricardo Sanz García, who she later married. During the years 1922 and 1923, she was part of the armed libertarian action group Los Solidarios, in which she acted as a courier carrying correspondence, money and weapons to militants from Asturias, the Basque Country, Aragon and Catalonia.

During the Second Spanish Republic, Not participated in support groups for prisoners with fellow anarcho-syndicalist militants Rosario Dolcet Martí and Llibertat Ródenas Rodriguez.

She died due to complications of childbirth giving birth to her daughter, Violeta, in June 1938.

References 

Confederación Nacional del Trabajo members
Anarcho-syndicalists

Spanish anarchists
Anarchists from Catalonia
1900 births
1938 deaths